Khaled Abdullah Hassan (born 6 February 1966) is a Bahraini hurdler. He competed in the men's 110 metres hurdles at the 1992 Summer Olympics.

References

1966 births
Living people
Athletes (track and field) at the 1992 Summer Olympics
Bahraini male hurdlers
Olympic athletes of Bahrain
Place of birth missing (living people)